Q Manual: The Illustrated Guide to the World's Finest Armory is a supplement published by Victory Games in 1983 for the James Bond 007 role-playing game.

Contents
In 1983, Victory Games, a branch of Avalon Hill, published the James Bond 007 role-playing game based on Ian Fleming's spy novels and the popular movies. Q Manual, designed by Greg Gorden, with equipment illustrations by Stuart Leuthner and other artwork by James Talbot, was published the same year to provide further detail for the game. 

The 148-page book purports to be a catalogue of equipment considered essential for a "00" agent, with added comments about each item by "Q". (In the novels and movies, "Q" is the code name of the armorer for the British Secret Service.) Equipment includes weapons; vehicles; common devices such as umbrellas and attache cases that could contain hidden weapons or other equipment; surveillance devices; "exotic" devices such as Oddjob's hat from Goldfinger; and poisons, drugs and chemicals. Some details of the secretive Q Branch and some of its members are included.

Reception
In the February 1984 edition of Imagine (Issue 11), Nick Davison thought that "The Q Manual is clearly an essential aid to the basic game. It contains not only a wealth of equipment, but also background on Q branch and its members (some of which are not in the films)." Davison liked the range of equipment as well as the accurate illustrations. He concluded that it was perhaps a bit expensive but still worth the money, saying, "Perhaps the colour stills from the films upped the price a little; beyond that, a valuable companion." 

In the March 1984 edition of Dragon (Issue 83), Tracy Hickman thought that this book would be a good read on its own, saying, "Even without the game, the Q Manual is a treat." Hickman liked the "almost conversational way that each piece of equipment is discussed." He concluded, "If you play any type of espionage role-playing game, the equipment descriptions will be a valuable resource. And... this is a great daydreaming book for any Bond fan."

In the October 1984 edition of White Dwarf (Issue #58), Bob Neville thought this supplement was essential, saying, "With even the famous Aston Martin DB-V detailed, the Q Manual is a very good value addition to the game, the catch being that it is almost essential for playing 007 satisfactorily." He concluded by giving the supplement an excellent overall rating of 9 out of 10.

Other reviews
 Heroes (Vol. 1, No. 3 and No. 4)
Different Worlds #35 (July/Aug., 1984)
 Casus Belli #21 (Aug. 1984)
Jeux & Stratégie #56 (as "Le Manuel du Service Q")

References

James Bond 007 (role-playing game) supplements
Role-playing game supplements introduced in 1983